Pat Cash and Mark Philippoussis were the defending champions, and successfully defended their title, defeating John and Patrick McEnroe in the final 6–4, 6–3.

Draw

Finals

External links 
Men's Champions Doubles Draw

Men's Champions Invatiational